Frederick Smyth (1832 in Galway, Ireland – August 18, 1900 in Atlantic City, New Jersey) was an American lawyer and politician from New York.

Life
He was the son of Matthew Thomas Smyth who was one of the two sheriffs of the City of Galway from 1817 to 1822. After the death of his father, Frederick emigrated to New York City in 1849. He studied law at first with Florence McCarthy, who was elected to the New York City Marine Court in 1850. Smyth then studied law and with John McKeon, and was admitted to the bar in 1855. McKeon had been appointed United States Attorney for the Southern District of New York in 1854, and appointed Smyth as one of his Assistant US Attorneys. At the end of McKeon's term in 1858, Smyth and McKeon formed a law partnership which lasted until the end of 1878.

Smyth was a school commissioner from 1863 to 1865. In November 1875, Smyth ran on the Tammany Hall ticket for Recorder of New York City, but was defeated by John K. Hackett, the incumbent Tammany man who—after having been dropped from the ticket—had been nominated by Republicans and Anti-Tammany Democrats. Smyth was a delegate to the 1876 Democratic National Convention, and later the same year was a presidential elector casting his vote for Samuel J. Tilden and Thomas A. Hendricks. In November 1878, Smyth ran on the Tammany ticket for New York County District Attorney but was defeated by the Republican incumbent Benjamin K. Phelps. In November 1879, Smyth ran on the Tammany ticket for Judge of the Court of Common Pleas, but was defeated by Miles Beach.

After Hackett's death, Smyth was elected on December 31, 1879, by the Board of Supervisors of New York County as Recorder of New York City to fill the vacancy until the next election. In November 1880, Smyth was elected on the Tammany ticket to succeed himself for a term of 14 years, but was defeated for re-election in November 1894 by John W. Goff who was elected on a fusion ticket nominated jointly by all other political organizations and parties, except Tammany.

In May 1895, Smyth was elected Grand Sachem of the Tammany Society. In November 1895, Smyth was elected to a 14-year term on the New York Supreme Court (1st D.). Smyth lived at 15 West Forty-sixth Str., but died from pneumonia during an extended summer vacation at the Hotel Dennis in Atlantic City. He was buried at Green-Wood Cemetery.

Smyth married Anna Augusta Findlay (d. 1895), and their only surviving child was Anna Augusta Smyth who died unmarried in 1924.

Sources
The History of the Town and County of the Town of Galway by James Hardiman (Dublin, 1820; page 1829)
'A Statistical and Agricultural Survey of the County of Galway'' by Hely Dutton (Dublin, 1824; pages 322f)
MR. SMYTH THE RECORDER in NYT on January 1, 1880
STRONG!; TAMMANY OVERWHELMED BY A PLURALITY OF ABOUT 50,000 in NYT on November 7, 1894
EX-RECORDER SMYTH'S WIFE DEAD in NYT on March 31, 1895
MR. SMYTH GRAND SACHEM in NYT on May 14, 1895
JUSTICE SMYTH IS DEAD in NYT on August 19, 1900 [states erroneously that his father was "the High Sheriff of the County"]
WILL OF JUSTICE SMYTH in NYT on September 6, 1900
Miss Smyth and J. H. Cowles Engaged in NYT on September 20, 1911 [the marriage apparently never took place]
SMYTH ESTATE TO FRIEND; Daughter of Late Recorder Cuts Off Relatives in NYT on March 2, 1924 (subscription required)

External links

1832 births
1900 deaths
19th-century Irish people
New York City Recorders
People from Galway (city)
Politicians from County Galway
New York Supreme Court Justices
New York (state) Democrats
1876 United States presidential electors
Deaths from pneumonia in New Jersey
Burials at Green-Wood Cemetery
19th-century American judges